The Valley Morning Star, established in 1909 as the Harlingen Star, is an American newspaper published in Harlingen in the U.S. state of Texas. In 1938, The New York Times reported on a printer's strike at the newspaper that was organized by the Typographical Union. In 1951, the newspaper was bought by Raymond C. Hoiles. In 2012, Freedom Communications papers in Texas were sold to AIM Media Texas.

References

External links

Valley Morning Star mobile website
 

Daily newspapers published in Texas
Harlingen, Texas
Publications established in 1909